Pokiok is a rural community in York County, New Brunswick, Canada.

The Pokiok Falls were a local tourist attraction until construction of the Mactaquac Dam in 1967 saw them flooded by the rising reservoir.

In early spring the reservoir water level is lowered to prevent flooding from spring runoff.  During this time you can see part of the Pokiok gorge where the falls once ran.

Previous spelling—Poquiock.

History

Notable people

See also
List of communities in New Brunswick

References

Pokiok